Paolo Pucci (born 21 April 1935) is a retired Italian freestyle swimmer and water polo player who competed in the 1956 Summer Olympics. He was eliminated in the semi-finals of the 100 m freestyle competition and finished fourth with the Italian water polo team.

Pucci won a gold medal at the 1958 European Aquatics Championships in the 100 m freestyle, becoming Italy's first swimming European champion.

See also
 Italian record progression 100 metres freestyle
 Italian record progression 200 metres freestyle

References

1935 births
Living people
Swimmers from Rome
Italian male swimmers
Italian male water polo players
Olympic swimmers of Italy
Olympic water polo players of Italy
Swimmers at the 1956 Summer Olympics
Water polo players at the 1956 Summer Olympics
European Aquatics Championships medalists in swimming
Mediterranean Games gold medalists for Italy
Swimmers at the 1955 Mediterranean Games
Swimmers at the 1959 Mediterranean Games
Universiade medalists in swimming
Mediterranean Games medalists in water polo
Mediterranean Games medalists in swimming
Universiade bronze medalists for Italy
Medalists at the 1959 Summer Universiade
Water polo players from Rome